Woodstock 99: Peace, Love, and Rage is a 2021 documentary film about the music festival Woodstock '99.

Summary
The film features interviews in which the concert promoters, workers, performers, and attendees share their experiences of the infamous 3-day festival that was marred by intense heat, overpricing, violence, sexual assault, looting, vandalism, and fires.

Cast

Production
Director Garret Price said in a 2021 interview that he thought the late 1990s had a "toxic" culture. Price reflected that when the festival took place, he and his college roommates "were glued to the pay-per-view that whole weekend", adding "It’s weird, though, as all that chaos unfolded in real time, it never felt crazy to me back then — it was almost like this extreme FOMO, wishing I was there. It wasn’t until years later when I started going down a YouTube rabbit hole of reliving the performances and reading articles that I started to understand all the issues that started to unfold that weekend. Not just of the festival itself, but of America culturally." Price also remarked, "I think the reason the '90s are so in right now is that people are nostalgic for the decade they were born in. So kids at Woodstock '99 were nostalgic for the mid-late '70s, with Dazed and Confused being popular. But Woodstock ’99 tried to push a nostalgia for the last '60s, and the ideals of counterculture and free love."

It was the first film of the six-part documentary series Music Box.

Release
Woodstock 99: Peace, Love, and Rage premiered on July 23, 2021 (the 22nd anniversary of the concert's first day), on HBO and HBO Max.

Reception
 The critics consensus reads, "Woodstock 99 documents the notorious music festival like an unraveling horror film to visceral effect, presenting a flashpoint in cultural nadir while suggesting that it was also a sign of troubles to come."

See also
Trainwreck: Woodstock '99, another documentary about Woodstock '99
Baby boomers
Generation X
Nu metal
Progressive hip hop
Grunge rock
Coachella Festival
Columbine shootings

References

External links
 
 Official trailer

2021 films
2021 television films
2021 documentary films
Documentary films about music festivals
Woodstock Festival